The Willmar WarHawks are a Tier III ice hockey team playing in the North American 3 Hockey League (NA3HL). The team plays their home games at the Willmar Civic Center located in Willmar, Minnesota. NA3HL teams play a 48-game regular season, in addition to showcase and post-season games.

History

Established as the Minnesota Flying Aces, the franchise's first season was in 2007–08 as members of the Minnesota Junior Hockey League (MnJHL). The Flying Aces were based out Little Falls, Minnesota, and played their home games at Exchange Arena. Following the 2010–11 season, the franchise moved to the North American 3 Hockey League along with in-state rival, the Granite City Lumberjacks.

On May 24, 2016, Flying Aces owners John and Debbie Holthaus sold the franchise to Blizzard Hockey, LLC. Blizzard Hockey also owns the North American Hockey League's Brookings Blizzard and the NA3HL's Alexandria Blizzard. The new owners then relocated the franchise to Willmar, Minnesota, and renamed the team Willmar WarHawks.

Season-by-season records

Alumni 
 Blake Anderson (2014) - Kirkland Lake Gold Miners; UW-River Falls (NCAA Division III)
 Alec Brandrup (2013) - Melville Millionaires; Norwich University (NCAA Division III)
 Giacomo Del Ponte (2011) - HC Red Ice Martigny-Verbier
 Brad Hauser (2013) - St. Mary's University (NCAA Division III)
 Luc Kilgore (2011) - Johnson & Wales University (NCAA Division III); Knoxville Ice Bears, Macon Mayhem (SPHL)
 Johno May (2013) - Minnesota Wilderness; American International College (NCAA Division I)
 Lee Melde (2010) - Duluth Clydesdales; State University of New York at Canton (NCAA Division III)
 Dylan Nelson (2013) - Waywayseecappo Wolverines; UW-Superior (NCAA Division III)
 Tyler Pionk (2012) - Minot Minotauros; Western New England University (NCAA Division III)
 André Pison (2013) - Denmark U18 and U20; Wenatchee Wild; Wichita Falls Wildcats
 Michael Raynee (2010) - Botkyrka HC
 Tate Sykes (2013) - Odessa Jackalopes; UW-Eau Claire (NCAA Division III)
 Mason Wyman (2013) - Odessa Jackalopes; Gustavus (NCAA Division III)

References

External links
WarHawks website
NA3HL website

Ice hockey teams in Minnesota
2007 establishments in Minnesota
Ice hockey clubs established in 2007
Willmar, Minnesota